Großheide (East Frisian: Grootheid) is a village and a municipality in the district of Aurich, in Lower Saxony, Germany. It is situated approximately 10 km east of Norden, and 15 km northwest of Aurich.

Community structure 
The municipality Großheide consists of 10 districts and incorporated villages:

 Arle
 Berumerfehn
 Coldinne
 Großheide
 Menstede
 Ostermoordorf
 Südarle
 Südcoldinne
 Westerende 
 Westermoordorf

References

Towns and villages in East Frisia
Aurich (district)